was a town located in Anpachi District, Gifu Prefecture, Japan.

As of 2003, the town had an estimated population of 4,652 and a density of 1,372.39 persons per km². The total area was 3.39 km².

On March 27, 2006, Sunomata, along with the town of Kamiishizu (from Yōrō District), was merged into the expanded city of Ōgaki.

Notes

External links
Ōgaki official website 

Dissolved municipalities of Gifu Prefecture